Assenede is a municipality located in the Belgian province of East Flanders. The municipality comprises the towns of Assenede proper, Boekhoute  and Oosteeklo. On 1 January 2021, Assenede had a total population of 14,369. The total area is 87.22 km².

History
Assenede is one of the oldest villages in Flanders, the earliest mention of Assenede date back to as early as the 10th century.

Geography 
Assenede stands on two different types of soil, to the west most of the land is pure sand and called "Houtland" (woodland), and the side towards the northeast is mainly polder of the marsh type because Assenede and Boekhoute bordered the sea during the Middle Ages. The harbor in Assenede disappeared around 1500 but a small canal called the Vliet maintained some access to the Boekhouter 's harbor that existed much longer, and was present to around 1946. The last polder dyke was closed after that year. The creeks are nature reserves.

Gallery

References

External links

 

 
Municipalities of East Flanders
Populated places in East Flanders